Air Vice-Marshal Giles Leslie Legood,  (born 1967) is a British Anglican priest. Since July 2022 he has served as Chaplain-in-Chief of the Royal Air Force Chaplains Branch and Archdeacon for the Royal Air Force. He previously served as Deputy Chaplain-in-Chief.

Early life and education
Legood was born in Maidstone in Kent and grew up in Bearsted. He was educated at Roseacre Junior School, and later Maidstone Grammar School. He studied at King's College London, graduating in 1988 with a Bachelor of Divinity (BD) degree and the Associate of King's College (AKC) qualification. He then worked in the City of London for two years.

From 1990 to 1992, he trained for ordained ministry at Ripon College Cuddesdon, an Anglican theological college near Oxford. He later undertook postgraduate studies, graduated from Heythrop College London with a Master of Theology (MTh) degree in 1998 and from Derby University with a Doctor of Ministry (DMin) degree in 2004.

Ordained ministry

Legood was ordained in the Church of England as a deacon in 1992 and as a priest in 1993. From 1992 to 1995, he served his curacy at St Mary's Church, North Mymms in the Diocese of St Albans. He was made Chaplain and Honorary Lecturer in the University of London in 1995.

Military service
On 20 October 2004, Legood was commissioned into the Chaplains Branch, Royal Auxiliary Air Force, as a flight lieutenant. He was attached to No. 600 Squadron RAF, and was the RAF's first part-time chaplain.

In 2007, Legood transferred to the Royal Air Force as a full-time chaplain. He served as chaplain to RAF Northolt, and served in Iraq and Afghanistan. In 2013, he was promoted to the relative rank of wing commander. In 2015 he became senior chaplain at RAF Brize Norton. During his time there, and earlier in service, he joined detachments to the Falkland Islands, Germany, Cyprus, Ascension Island, Kenya and Saudi Arabia. 

In 2017, Legood was promoted to Deputy Chaplain-in-Chief (Operations) and was based at Headquarters Air Command.

From 2021 to 2022, Legood attended the Royal College of Defence Studies. On 5 August 2022, on completion of his course, he was appointed Chaplain in Chief (head of the RAF Chaplains Branch) and promoted to the relative rank of air vice-marshal. As the most senior Anglican chaplain, he also additionally serves as Archdeacon for the Royal Air Force.

Honours and decorations
In 2014, Legood was appointed a Member of the Order of the British Empire (MBE) in recognition of gallant and distinguished services in Afghanistan during the period 1 April 2013 to 30 September 2013.  This made him the first RAF chaplain to receive an operational honour since the Second World War. On 22 July 2018, he was made an Honorary Chaplain to the Queen (QHC). He is also a recipient of the Iraq Medal, the Operational Service Medal for Afghanistan, the Operational Service Medal Iraq and Syria, the Queen Elizabeth II Diamond Jubilee Medal, and Queen Elizabeth II Platinum Jubilee Medal.

References

Living people
1967 births
People from Maidstone
Royal Air Force air marshals
Royal Air Force Chaplains-in-Chief
20th-century English Anglican priests
21st-century English Anglican priests
Honorary Chaplains to the Queen
Church of England archdeacons (military)
21st-century Royal Air Force personnel
Members of the Order of the British Empire
People educated at Maidstone Grammar School
Alumni of King's College London
Associates of King's College London
Alumni of Ripon College Cuddesdon
Alumni of Heythrop College
Alumni of the University of Derby
Royal Air Force personnel of the Iraq War
Royal Air Force personnel of the War in Afghanistan (2001–2021)